"Free Way" was the second Japanese single taken from the forthcoming debut Eternal Rain, from Korean singer, Rain. The single was released on June 7, 2006 throughout Japan, it peaked at the 15th position on the Oricon Charts. Free Way is often compared to the single, Rock Your Body by American singer Justin Timberlake. Many reasons for this are the music video similarities and the disco/funk melodies featured in the song.

Music video
In the video for Free Way, we see singer Rain dancing in a dark black room with what appears to be television screens displaying an assorted collection of colorful holograms.  The screens continue to change while Rain and his dancers dance around the area.  Throughout the video a total of two outfit changes take place, the first outfit being of all white and the second being of all black.

Track listing
CD Single
 Free Way
 Feel So Right
 Free Way [Instrumental Version]
 Feel So Right [Instrumental Version]

DVD Single Disc 1
 Free Way - Music Video
 Making of Free Way

DVD Single Disc 2
 Free Way
 Feel So Right
 Free Way [Instrumental Version]
 Feel So Right [Instrumental Version]

Charts

Sales: 17,005

References

External links
 Rain - Official English website 

2006 singles
Rain (entertainer) songs
Korean-language songs
2006 songs